Elachista subula is a moth in the family Elachistidae. It was described by Parenti in 1991. It is found in Mongolia and Russia (Tuva).

References

Moths described in 1991
subula
Moths of Asia